Mildmay may refer to:

Places
Mildmay, Islington, Greater London, United Kingdom
Mildmay, Ontario, Canada

People

Title
 Baron Mildmay of Flete, a title in the Peerage of the United Kingdom

Surname
 Mildmay baronets, two baronetcies of Moulsham, Essex, created 1611 and 1765
 Audrey Mildmay (1900–1953), Canadian soprano
 Anthony Mildmay (died 1617), MP and diplomat
 Grace Mildmay (née Sharington; 1552–1620), diarist, medical practitioner, and wife of Sir Anthony
 Henry Mildmay (disambiguation)
 Thomas Mildmay (disambiguation)
 Walter Mildmay (bef. 1523–1589), an Elizabethan Chancellor of the Exchequer

Given name
 Mildmay Fane (disambiguation)

Other
 Mildmay Mission, a health and welfare charity founded in the 1860s by William Pennefather
 Mildmay Mission Hospital, a health and welfare charity founded in the memory of William Pennefather; see Maud Cattell
 Mildmay Monarchs, an ice hockey team from Mildmay, Ontario

See also
 Mildmay Park railway station, near Newington Green, Greater London, United Kingdom
 St John-Mildmay baronets